Joseph John "Joe" Barzda (May 22, 1915 – October 11, 1993) was an American racing driver from New Brunswick, New Jersey.

Barzda was primarily a midget racing and sprint car racing driver but made ten starts in the USAC National Championship from 1952 to 1959. His best race finish was a pair of fourth places in 1958 at Springfield and Trenton. He finished 18th in the 1958 National Championship. He unsuccessfully attempted to qualify for the Indianapolis 500 in 1951, 1952, and 1953. He retired after he was involved in a crash at Williams Grove Speedway in 1959 where Van Johnson died. Barzda survived with minor injuries.

In 1958 and 1959, Barzda was noted for fielding a Chevrolet-powered sprint car at a time when nearly all competitive sprint cars had Offenhauser engines.

He and his brother Jim owned California Speed Shop in New Brunswick, New Jersey and continued to field racing cars after Joe's retirement from the cockpit.

Racing record

Complete Formula One World Championship results
(key)

References

External links
Joe Barzda on Champ Car Stats
Joe Barzda on Ultimate Racing History

1915 births
1993 deaths
American racing drivers
Sportspeople from New Brunswick, New Jersey
20th-century American people